Afik is an Israeli settlement organized as a kibbutz in the Golan Heights. It was established in 1972 close to the abandoned Syrian village of Fiq following Israel's capture and occupation of the Golan Heights in the 1973 Yom Kippur War. In , it had a population of ..

The international community considers Israeli settlements in the Golan Heights illegal under international law, while the Israeli government disputes this.

Name and biblical Aphek
There are multiple locations called Aphek in the Bible, and the location of the kibbutz was believed to be adjacent to the ruins of the ancient Aphek mentioned in the Books of Kings, which tells how King Ahab of Israel defeated Ben-Hadad I of Damascus and the prophet Elisha foretold that King Jehoash of Israel would defeat Ben-Hadad III of Damascus three times. Archaeologists however lately favour Tel 'En Gev/Khirbet el-'Asheq within Kibbutz Ein Gev as the site of biblical Aphek.

Name and biblical Aphek
There are multiple locations called Aphek in the Bible, and the location of the kibbutz was believed to be adjacent to the ruins of the ancient Aphek mentioned in the Books of Kings, which tells how King Ahab of Israel defeated Ben-Hadad I of Damascus and the prophet Elisha foretold that King Jehoash of Israel would defeat Ben-Hadad III of Damascus three times. Archaeologists however lately favour Tel 'En Gev/Khirbet el-'Asheq within Kibbutz Ein Gev as the site of biblical Aphek.

History

Kibbutz Afik, affiliated with Ihud HaKvutzot VeHaKibbutzim, was established near the site of the abandoned Syrian village of Fiq on 8 May 1972. It falls under the municipal jurisdiction of the Golan Regional Council, and the Fik Airfield is located nearby.

Economy
Economic branches include agriculture (seasonal vegetables, pulses, and fruit orchards), dairy cattle and chicken coops. The kibbutz also operates several factories in partnership with Yifat such as Afic Printing Solutions, which produces toners and ink cartridges. Afik shares ownership of Hamat Gader, a hot mineral springs health resort, with three other kibbutzim. Another source of employment is the Orhan Afik guesthouse.

Notable people
 Shimon Sheves (born 1952), Israeli political strategic advisor

See also
 Israeli-occupied territories

References

Israeli settlements in the Golan Heights
Kibbutz Movement
Hebrew Bible places
Golan Regional Council
Populated places in Northern District (Israel)
Populated places established in 1972
1972 establishments in the Israeli Military Governorate